Frailea mammifera is a species of Frailea from Bolivia and Argentina.

References

External links
 
 

mammifera